The Huntington Johnnies were a minor league baseball, based in Huntington, Indiana, as a member of the Northern State of Indiana League from 1909-1911. Prior to being named the Johnnies, the team played as the Huntington Miamis in the short-lived Indiana-Ohio League in 1908. The team  changed its name for a final time, in 1911, to the Huntington Indians before folding.

Team name
The "Miamis" name was in reference to the Miami people, a Native-American tribe that inhabited parts of Indiana, Michigan and western Ohio, while the Johnnies name holds various meanings.  The name be traced to three Civil War references. The first being John Hunt Morgan, a Confederate general who raided southern Indiana in 1863. The second reference for soldiers in the Union Army, termed "Johnnies", after the song, When Johnny Comes Marching Home.  Then the third reference to confederate soldiers known as "Johnny Rebs".  However the name can also be a reference to the team's manager from 1909-1911, John Lawrence "Larry" "Johnny" Strands. Meanwhile the "Indians" moniker was a spin-off of the Miami Indian name from the 1908 team.

Year-by-year record

References

1911 disestablishments in Indiana
Defunct baseball teams in Indiana
Baseball teams established in 1908
Baseball teams disestablished in 1911
1908 establishments in Indiana
Huntington County, Indiana
Northern State of Indiana League teams